Argo Aadli (born 12 April 1980) is an Estonian theatre and film actor.

Biography

Education and career
Born in Kunda, Estonia, Aadli graduated from the Higher Theatre School of the Estonian Academy of Music and Theatre in 2002.

Aadli has worked as an actor in Tallinn City Theatre where he has performed at least ten productions to date, notably the character of Zahhar in the Anton Chekhov play "Pianola or The Mechanical Piano" in 2002. Aside from this he has been involved in several films including Names in Marble (2002) where he played Konsap, and Lotte from Gadgetville (2006) where he voiced Albert.

Theatre credits
 Zametov (Fyodor Dostoyevski / Elmo Nüganen Crime and punishment, 1999)
 Lauri (Aleksis Kivi Seven Brothers, 2001)
 Zahhar (Anton Chekhov Pianola or The Mechanical Piano, 2002)
 Gregor Samsa (Franz Kafka The Metamorphosis, 2004)
 Indrek Paas (A. H. Tammsaare / Elmo Nüganen Truth and Justice. Part Two., 2005)
 Ajakirjanik Pilu (A. H. Tammsaare / Elmo Nüganen "Karin. Indrek. Truth and Justice. Part Four.", 2006)

Selected filmography

References

External links

Argo Aadli at the Tallinn City Theatre webpage

1980 births
Living people
People from Kunda, Estonia
Estonian male stage actors
Estonian male film actors
Estonian male voice actors
Estonian male television actors
21st-century Estonian male actors
Estonian Academy of Music and Theatre alumni